Bobby Marcel Wilson (born February 27, 1980), better known by his stage name Bobby V (formerly known as Bobby Valentino), is an American R&B singer. He was first a member of the R&B group Mista in 1994, before signing to rapper Ludacris through his label imprint, Disturbing tha Peace under Def Jam Recordings in 2005. Bobby V's first single as a solo artist, "Slow Down", released in February 2005, peaked at number 8 on Billboards Hot 100 chart. The single was certified gold by the RIAA and became the lead single for his eponymous debut album (2005)—which peaked at number 3 on the Billboard 200 and had a follow up single, "Tell Me" (featuring Lil Wayne).

His next album, Special Occasion was released in May 2007, and warranted success from its second single, "Anonymous" (featuring Timbaland). He has charted three No. 1 albums on Billboards U.S. Top R&B Chart since 2006.

Life and career

1980–2004: Early life and career beginnings 
Bobby Marcel Wilson was born on February 27, 1980, in Mississippi. He later moved to Atlanta, Georgia. Growing up, Wilson listened to Michael Jackson, Tony! Toni! Toné!, Marvin Gaye, Jodeci, and The Isley Brothers. Those were the artists that inspired him to become a R&B singer. Wilson entered the music scene in 1996 as a member of the R&B youth quartet Mista, at this time using his real name, Bobby Wilson. The new teenage R&B group released their first record. Under the production of Organized Noize (TLC's "Waterfalls"), the group released their self-titled debut album, which produced the hit single "Blackberry Molasses". However, the album did not follow in the same success and despite a second album being produced by Tim & Bob, it was never released. Due to management issues the group split in 1997. Wilson later enrolled at Clark Atlanta University majoring in mass communications. While in school, Wilson continued to record in his free time in hopes of one day returning to the stage.

2005–2007: Debut album and Special Occasion 
Bobby Valentino was released in the spring of 2005 through Island Def Jam and Ludacris' Disturbing tha Peace label and was certified gold by the RIAA selling over 708,000 copies in the United States. Primarily produced by hitmakers Tim & Bob, his first single, "Slow Down", became a Top 10 hit on the U.S. Billboard Hot 100 chart and a #1 R&B single on the Billboard R&B Singles chart receiving a large amount of radio and TV airplay. Also in 2005, he joined Bow Wow, Omarion, Marques Houston, B5 and Pretty Ricky on the Scream Tour IV. After the success of "Slow Down", he released a second single, a remix of his song "Tell Me" featuring Lil Wayne, produced by Tim & Bob as well. The album's third and final single, "My Angel", was released in the fall of 2005, however it gained little popularity. Gearing up for the release of his 2007 sophomore effort Special Occasion, Bobby V released the album's first single titled "Turn the Page" with mixed reviews. His second single, "Anonymous" featuring Timbaland, was released on April 9, 2007. Overall, the album received positive reviews from critics and audiences. He later returned to his pier appearing on the debut episode of MTV's Once Upon A Prom, which aired on May 19, 2007.

2008–2009: New label and The Rebirth 
In early 2008, Bobby V confirmed that he was no longer signed to either Def Jam or Disturbing tha Peace during an interview with DJBooth.net. He stated:

Around this time the British musician Bobby Valentino brought an action against the Bobby V (then billed as "Bobby Valentino") and his then record label Def Jam for "Passing off, trademark infringement, and breach of contract, in relation to record sales, recorded content, and artist's live performances".

Due to the poor album sales of the second album, Special Occasions failing to reach gold or platinum sales, Bobby V was reportedly frustrated with the album's delays and less than expected sales, culminating in his decision to leave the labels. Although business ties have been severed, Bobby V maintains positive relationships with CEO Chaka Zulu, Ludacris and the Disturbing tha Peace/Def Jam staff. In April 2008, Come with Me was released through digital outlets and featured the single "Another Life". In July 2008, three months after being dropped from Def Jam Recordings and leaving Disturbing tha Peace Records, Bobby V signed a new deal with EMI, which will house his imprint Blu Kolla Dreams. In regards to the new label his manager and co-CEO of Blu Kolla Dreams Courtney "Colt Luv" Stewart stated:

In addition, Bobby V announced the release of a new album titled The Rebirth. When asked about his powerful new album Bobby V stated:

The Rebirth was released on February 10, 2009, under his new stage name "Bobby V". The album's first official single "Beep" featuring Yung Joc was released via iTunes on October 7, 2008. In the fall of 2009, Bobby V performed under his new alias at Rutgers University Hot Dog Knight. V's third studio album features production by Tim & Bob, Raphael Saadiq, LOS Da Maestro and Big Fruit.

2010–present 
Bobby V released his fourth studio album Fly on the Wall on March 22, 2011. The first single was "Phone #", which features rapper Plies and was produced by Jazze Pha. In December 2010, Bobby V released his second single "Words" off of "Fly on the Wall". In February 2011, Bobby V released his third single "Rock Wit'cha", a remake from Bobby Brown's 1989 album Don't Be Cruel. "Grab Somebody, which features rapper Twista was his fourth single. Bobby V later appeared alongside rappers Nicki Minaj and Lil Wayne on the song "Sex in the Lounge" from Minaj's second album Pink Friday: Roman Reloaded. In May 2012, Bobby V released the first single from his album, Dusk Till Dawn, titled "Mirror", which features rapper Lil Wayne. On October 16, 2012. Dusk Till Dawn was released. The album sold 50 000 copies in the first week.

In April 2013, Bobby V announced that he was working on a new project, Peach Moon. The first single from Peach Moon was "Back To Love". Bobby V released Peach Moon on December 10, 2013. On January 28, 2015, Bobby V was featured in a single released by Gotti, called "I Need a Girl." In January 2016, Bobby V made a partnership with Michael Caseau to aid in media direction, investments, and management. Also in 2016, he released the soundtrack to the BET film Hollywood Hearts.

In September 2017, Bobby V signed a new label deal with SoNo Recording Group distributed by Universal Music Group. The label reunites him with record producer and A&R man Tim Kelley, who co-produced his 2005 debut, Disturbing Tha Peace Presents Bobby Valentino. The new album Electrik which was produced entirely by Tim Kelley, was released on March 9, 2018.  The album debuted on the Billboard R&B Album Chart at #7.  Electrik includes a collaboration with Snoop Dogg on the album's first single "Lil' Bit".

In June 2022, Bobby V participated in Verzuz, paired with Ray J and went against Sammie with Pleasure P. Their segment went viral for multiple reasons, resulting in the four singers to meet virtually on social media where they came together and develop a R&B supergroup R.S.V.P, which currently is in development.

Personal life
Wilson has one child: a daughter born in 2017.

Discography 

Studio albums
 Bobby Valentino (2005)
 Special Occasion (2007)
 The Rebirth (2009)
 Fly on the Wall (2011)
 Dusk Till Dawn (2012)
 Electrik (2018)

Filmography 
 Hollywood Hearts (TV movie; 2016)

Awards and nominations 
 Urban Music Awards
 2009, Urban Music Award for Best Male Artist (won)
 2009, Urban Music Award for Best R&B Act (won)
 NAACP Image Awards
 2006, Outstanding New Artist (nominated)
 Soul Train Music Awards
 2006, Best R&B/Soul Single, Male: "Slow Down" (nominated)
 2006, Best R&B/Soul or Rap New Artist (nominated)
 Vibe Awards
 2005, Reelest Video: "Pimpin' All Over the World" (nominated)
 BMI Awards
 2005, Song of the Year: "Slow Down" (won)

References

External links 
 

1980 births
20th-century American singers
20th-century African-American male singers
American contemporary R&B singers
American hip hop singers
American tenors
Clark Atlanta University alumni
Living people
Musicians from Atlanta
Musicians from Jackson, Mississippi
Songwriters from Georgia (U.S. state)
Songwriters from Mississippi
20th-century American male singers
21st-century American male singers
21st-century American singers
African-American songwriters
21st-century African-American male singers
American male songwriters